Octyldodecanol is a branched-chain primary alcohol used as the isomer 2-octyl-1-dodecanol in cosmetics such as lipstick, or as an anti-blooming agent in facepowder. It is a medium spreading emollient, with equilibrium spreading pressure of 17.0 dyne/cm. Octyldodecanol is in the class of Guerbet alcohols, because it has the branch at the β position. Compared to arachidyl alcohol, the linear alcohol of the same molecular weight, it has a lower melting point, yet retains low volatility.

Production
2-Octyldodecanol is produced by the Guerbet condensation of decyl alcohol.

Reactions
When octyldodecanol is melted with an alkali it yields octyldodecanoic acid by a dehydrogenation reaction.

References

Fatty alcohols
Primary alcohols
Cosmetics chemicals